The change of Xianbei family names to Han names was part of a larger sinicization campaign. It was at its peak intensity under Emperor Xiaowen of the Northern Wei dynasty in 496.

Background
To formalize sinification, a number of actions were taken prior to the name changes.
 In 493 the capital was moved to Luoyang, closer to the agricultural Han and away from the nomadic roots.
 In 494 nomadic style clothing were abandoned.
 In 495 nomadic languages at court were abandoned.

Changes
Northern Wei ordered Xianbei family names that were two-to-three syllables to be shortened to one-to-two syllables, converting them to Han names. Later historians, including Wei Shou, the author of the official history of Northern Wei, Book of Wei, found shortened Han-style names to be easier to write about, and therefore used post-496 family names even where pre-496 events involving Northern Wei were described. Later, after the division of Northern Wei into two in 534, the paramount general of Western Wei, Yuwen Tai, tried to reverse these name changes and restore Xianbei names. Yuwen Tai further had Han officials and generals change their names to Xianbei names. A number of generals and officials changed their names back to Xianbei names, but after the collapse of Western Wei, the regent Yang Jian near the end of Northern Zhou permanently restored the use of Han names for both Han and Xianbei alike. As a compromise, there were some exceptions, for example, the clan of Emperor Wen of Sui's wife Empress Dugu kept their Xianbei name of Dugu and did not once again change the name into Liu.

Name correspondence 
Below is a list of the Xianbei names that are known to have been changed into Han names:

 Tuoba (拓拔) (imperial clan name) -> Yuan (元)
 Tufa (秃髮) -> Yuan (源)
 Gegu (紇骨) -> Hu (胡)
 Pu (普) -> Zhou (周)
 Baba (拔拔) -> Zhangsun (長孫)
 Daxi (達奚) -> Xi (奚)
 Yilou (伊婁) -> Yi (伊)
 Qiudun (丘敦) -> Qiu (丘)
 Xiqihai (係俟亥) -> Hai (亥)
 Yizhan (乙旃) -> Shusun (叔孫)
 Chekun (車焜) -> Che (車)
 Qiumuling (丘穆陵) -> Mu (穆)
 Buliugu (步六孤) -> Lu (陸)
 Helai (賀賴) -> He (賀)
 Dugu (獨孤) -> Liu (劉)
 Helou (賀樓) -> Lou (樓)
 Wuniuyu (勿忸于) -> Yu (于)
 Shilian (是連) -> Lian (連)
 Pulan (僕闌) -> Pu (僕)
 Ruogan (若干) -> Gou (苟)
 Balielan (拔列蘭) -> Liang (梁)
 Bolue (撥略) -> Su (蘇)
 Ruokouyin (若口引) -> Kou (寇)
 Chiluo (叱羅) -> Luo (羅)
 Pulouru (普陋茹) -> Ru (茹)
 Hege (賀葛) -> Ge (葛)
 Shiben (是賁) -> Feng (封)
 Afugan (阿扶干) -> A (阿)
 Kediyan (可地延) -> Yan (延)
 Aluhuan (阿鹿桓) -> Lu (鹿)
 Taluoba (他駱拔) -> Luo (駱)
 Boxi (薄奚) -> Bo (薄)
 Wuwan (烏丸) -> Huan (桓)
 Suhe (素和) -> He (和)
 Hugukouyin (胡古口引) or Gukouyin (古口引) -> Hou (侯)
 Yuhun (谷渾) -> Hun (渾)
 Pilou (匹婁) -> Lou (婁)
 Qilifa (俟力伐) -> Bao (鮑)
 Tufulu (吐伏盧) -> Lu (盧)
 Dieyun (牒云) -> Yun (云)
 Shiyun (是云) -> Shi (是)
 Chili (叱利) -> Li (利)
 Fulü (副呂) -> Fu (副)
 Ruluo (如羅) -> Ru (如)
 Qifu (乞扶) -> Fu (扶)
 Kedan (可單 or 渴單) -> Dan (單) (Shàn)
 Qiji (俟幾) -> Ji (幾)
 He'er (賀兒) -> Er (兒)
 Tuxi (吐奚) -> Gu (古)
 Chulian (出連) -> Bi (畢)
 Heba (賀拔) -> He (何)
 Chilü (叱呂) -> Lü (呂)
 Monalou (莫那婁) -> Mo (莫)
 Xidoulu (奚斗盧) -> Suolu (索盧)
 Molu (莫蘆) -> Lu (蘆)
 Budahan (步大汗) -> Han (韓)
 Moluzhen (沒路真) -> Lu (路)
 Hudigan (扈地干) -> Hu (扈)
 Muyu (慕輿) -> Yu (輿)
 Gegan (紇干) -> Gan (干)
 Qifujin (俟伏斤) -> Fu (伏)
 Shilou (是樓) -> Gao (高)
 Qutu (屈突) -> Qu (屈)
 Talu (沓盧) -> Ta (沓)
 Washilan (嗢石蘭) -> Shi (石)
 Jiepi (解枇) -> Jie (解) (Xie)
 Qijin (奇斤) -> Qi (奇)
 Xubu (須卜) -> Bu (卜)
 Qiulin (丘林) -> Lin (林)
 Damogan (大莫干) -> Ge (郃)
 Ermian (尒綿) -> Mian (綿)
 Gailou (蓋樓) -> Gai (蓋)
 Suli (素黎) -> Li (黎)
 Yidoujuan (壹斗眷) -> Ming (明)
 Chimen (叱門) -> Men (門)
 Suliujin (宿六斤) -> Su (宿)
 Bibi (馝纰) -> Bi (纰)
 Tunan (土難) -> Shan (山)
 Wuyin (屋引) -> Fang (房)
 Shuluogan (樹洛干) -> Shu (樹)
 Yifu (乙弗) -> Yi (乙)
 Maojuan (茂眷) -> Mao (茂)
 Youlian (宥連) -> Yun (雲)
 Gedouling (紇豆陵) -> Dou (竇)
 Houmochen (侯莫陳) -> Chen (陳)
 Kudi (庫狄) -> Di (狄)
 Tailuoji (太洛稽) -> Ji (稽)
 Keba (柯拔) -> Ke (柯)
 Yuchi (尉遲) -> Yu (尉)
 Bulugen (步鹿根) -> Bu (步)
 Poduoluo (破多羅) -> Pan (潘)
 Chigan (叱干) -> Xue (薛)
 Qinu (俟奴) -> Qi (俟)
 Nianchi (輾遲) -> Zhan (展)
 Feilian (費連) -> Fei (費)
 Qilian (其連) -> Qi (綦)
 Qujin (去斤) -> Ai (艾)
 Kehou (渴侯) -> Gou (緱)
 Chilu (叱盧) -> Zhu (祝)
 Heji (和稽) -> Huan (緩)
 Tulai (菟賴) -> Jiu (就)
 Wapen (嗢盆) -> Wen (溫)
 Dabo (達勃) -> Bao (褒)
 Duguhun (獨孤渾) -> Du (杜)
 Helan (賀蘭) -> He (賀)
 Yuyuanzhen (郁原甄) -> Zhen (甄)
 Gexi (紇奚) -> Ji (嵇)
 Yuele (越勒) -> Yue (越)
 Chinu (叱奴) -> Lang (狼)
 Kezhuhun (渴燭渾) -> Zhu (朱)
 Kuruguan (庫褥官) -> Ku (庫)
 Wuluolan (烏洛蘭) -> Lan (蘭)
 Yinalou (一那蔞) -> Lou (蔞)
 Yufu (羽弗) -> Yu (羽)

Major Xianbei names that were not changed 
Several major Xianbei clan names were apparently judged by Emperor Xiaowen to be sufficiently Han-like to not to be changed.  These included:

 Tuyuhun (吐谷渾)
 Heruo (賀若)
 Na (那)
 Yu (庾)

See also

 Hundred family names
 Chinese surname

References

External links
鮮卑姓氏一覽Xianbei Surnames  《魏書.官氏志》
 Xianbei Names 鮮卑百家姓(Chinese Big5 code page) via Internet Archive

Northern Wei
Northern Zhou
496